Aamet José Calderón Tello (born 1 July 1998) is a Peruvian footballer who plays as a goalkeeper for Universitario.

References

External links
 

Living people
1998 births
Association football goalkeepers
Peruvian footballers
Peruvian Segunda División players
Club Universitario de Deportes footballers
People from Ica, Peru